A salted duck egg is an East Asian preserved food product made by soaking duck eggs in brine, or packing each egg in damp, salted charcoal. In Asian supermarkets across the Western world, these eggs are sometimes sold covered in a thick layer of salted charcoal paste. The eggs may also be sold with the salted paste removed, wrapped in plastic, and vacuum packed. From the salt curing process, the salted duck eggs have a briny aroma, a gelatin-like egg white and a firm-textured, round yolk that is bright orange-red in color.

Salted duck eggs are normally boiled or steamed before being peeled and eaten as a condiment to congee or cooked with other foods as a flavoring. The texture is gelatin like egg white and firm and has  a perfect round yolk. The egg white has a sharp, salty taste. The orange red yolk is rich, fatty, and less salty. The yolk is prized and is used in Chinese mooncakes to symbolize the moon.

Salted eggs can also be made from chicken eggs, though the taste and texture will be somewhat different, and the egg yolk will be less rich.

Salted eggs sold in the Philippines undergo a similar curing process, with some variation in ingredients used. They are dyed red (hence called itlog na pula or ‘red eggs' in English) to distinguish them from fresh duck eggs.

Production

Pateros method

A popular method for processing salted eggs in the Philippines is the Pateros method. The salted egg is prepared "Pateros style" by mixing clay (from ant hills or termite mounds), table salt and water in the ratio of 1:1:2 until the mixture becomes smooth and forms a thick texture similar to cake batter. The fresh, uncooked eggs are individually dipped in the admixture, and packed in 150-egg batches in newspaper-lined  wooden boxes (often residual boxes of dried fish packing). The whole batch is then lightly wrapped in newspapers to slow down the dehydration process.

The eggs are then stored indoors at room temperature over the next 12 to 14 days to cure, the salt equilibrating in the batch by osmosis. Curing can last up to 18 days, but that results in very long-lasting red eggs that can have a 40-day shelf life, which is largely unnecessary, as the eggs are stocked and replenished biweekly.

After the two-week curing period, the eggs are hand-cleaned with water and a brush and prepared to be boiled in low heat for 30 minutes. Time is measured from the first moment the water boils and the eggs are immersed. A 50-egg batch is then wrapped in fish nets for ease of removal from the cookware, which must be large enough to accommodate the batch with a  covering of water.

Chicken eggs may be processed the same way, although up to 10% of the batch can break during the process.

See also
Balut
Century egg
Chinese red eggs
List of egg dishes
Smoked egg
Tea egg

References

 Sandra Leong, 2008. Salted egg hunt, Mar 23, 2008, The Sunday Times

Raw egg dishes
Animal-based fermented foods
Chinese cuisine
Philippine cuisine
Thai cuisine